Nils Johnson (born 19 June 1956) is a Norwegian actor and theatre director.

Early life
He was born in Tønsberg, and is a brother of Guri Johnson.

Theatre career
He made his stage debut in 1980 at Nordland Teater, and then worked at Hålogaland Teater from 1981 to 1989 and Trøndelag Teater from 1989 to 2000. From 2001 to 2008 he was the director of Hålogaland Teater.

Movie career
Johnson portrayed also Jon in Cold Prey 3 under the direction from Mikkel Brænne Sandemose.

References

1956 births
Living people
Norwegian male stage actors
Norwegian theatre directors
People from Tønsberg